Ju Ho-Jin (born January 1, 1981 ) is a South Korean footballer. Since 2008, he has played for Incheon United (formerly Jeonbuk Hyundai and Gwangju Sangmu).

References

1981 births
Living people
South Korean footballers
Incheon United FC players
Association football defenders